Euarestella pninae is a species of tephritid or fruit flies in the genus Euarestella of the family Tephritidae.

Distribution
Israel, Egypt.

References

Tephritinae
Insects described in 1981
Diptera of Africa
Diptera of Asia